Capoeta aculeata is a cyprinid fish endemic to Iran. It is close to Capoeta capoeta and has sometimes been considered either synonymous with it or a subspecies Capoeta capoeta aculeata. However, Coad & Krupp concluded, on morphological grounds, that it deserves to be a valid species. This species has been reported from several water bodies in Iran, including Armand River, Kaaj River, Chaghakhor Laggon, Gandoman Lagoon, Gizehrud River, Na’in, Kor River, Namak Lake, and Zayandeh Rud River.

References 

Aculeata
Taxa named by Achille Valenciennes 
Fish described in 1844